Marius Eugène Chaboud (12 April 1907  – 28 December 1983) was a French racing driver.  He participated in three Formula One World Championship Grands Prix, scoring one championship point. He also participated in numerous non-Championship Formula One races.

Career
He completed his first car race in 1936 at age of 29 in a Delahaye sports car and partnered his mentor Jean Trémoulet in the 1937 24 Hours of Le Mans race, where they failed to finish. The following year however the partnership won the race in a Delahaye. In 1939 he won the Paris-Nice road race for Ecurie France and after the Second World War he won the 1946 Belgian Grand Prix at Bois de la Cambre in a Delage.

After Formula 1 was introduced in 1950, Chaboud drove a Talbot Lago T26 in several Formula 1 events, including three Grand Prix World Championship races, during 1950 and 1951, scoring only 1 championship point for a fifth place in the French Grand Prix.

He retired from the sport after crashing his Talbot-Lago T26 at Le Mans during the 1952 event, when he became trapped under his car.

Racing record

Complete Formula One World Championship results
(key)

''* Indicates shared drive with Philippe Étancelin. Chaboud had entered his Ecurie Lutetia Talbot-Lago but did not race this car.

Complete 24 Hours of Le Mans results

External links
 Profile on OldRacingCars.com
 Profile from Grand Prix Encyclopedia

1907 births
1983 deaths
Sportspeople from Lyon
French racing drivers
French Formula One drivers
24 Hours of Le Mans drivers
24 Hours of Le Mans winning drivers
Grand Prix drivers